Veriscope was an early film studio which produced The Corbett-Fitzsimmons Fight (1897), directed by Enoch J. Rector. 

Veriscope was a large, human-powered camera created by Enoch Rector. The camera operators were inside the camera, which was a tight wooden structure. 

The term is also used for the widescreen 63mm film format used to produce this feature film, which was about 100 minutes long.

See also
List of film formats

References

External links
Veriscope at IMDB
The Corbett-Fitzsimmons Fight at IMDB

Film production companies of the United States